Laurens Carnegie Free Library is a historic building located in Laurens, Iowa, United States.  It was designed by the Des Moines architectural firm of Wetherell and Gage and completed in 1910.  The Carnegie Corporation of New York had accepted the application for a grant from Laurens' literary association for $3,800 on February 6, 1907.  The Mission Revival structure measures , and has a projecting pavilion for the main entrance.  An addition was built onto the rear of the building in 1955.  The building now houses the Pocahontas County Historical Museum.  It was listed on the National Register of Historic Places in 1974.

References

External links
 Pocahontas County Historical Museum

Library buildings completed in 1910
Carnegie libraries in Iowa
Mission Revival architecture in Iowa
Buildings and structures in Pocahontas County, Iowa
Libraries on the National Register of Historic Places in Iowa
Museums in Pocahontas County, Iowa
National Register of Historic Places in Pocahontas County, Iowa